Coral del Mar Casanova is a Puerto Rican beauty pageant titleholder.

Career

Miss Universe Puerto Rico 2010
On November 12, 2009, Coral competed at the Miss Universe Puerto Rico 2010 pageant representing the city of Hatillo where she placed as one of the final five finalists in which she resulted as the 4th Runner-up. On April 22, 2010, Coral competed for the title of Miss Puerto Rico Earth, she was one of the Top Ten finalists.

See also
 Miss Puerto Rico 2010

References

External links
Miss Puerto Rico Official Website

1986 births
Living people
Miss Puerto Rico winners
Puerto Rican beauty pageant winners